IEEE Transactions on Instrumentation and Measurement is a bimonthly peer-reviewed scientific journal published by the IEEE Instrumentation and Measurement Society. It covers the theory, design and use of electronic instrumentation and measurement techniques. Its editor-in-chief is Ruqiang Yan (Xi'an Jiaotong University).

The journal was established in 1963 as the IRE Transactions on Instrumentation by Institute of Radio Engineers. According to the Journal Citation Reports, the journal has a 2021 impact factor of 5.332.

References

External links
 

Instrumentation and Measurement, IEEE Transactions on
English-language journals
Publications established in 1963
Bimonthly journals
Electronics journals